Break it down is Taiwanese Mandopop boyband SpeXial's second Mandarin studio album. The press conference of this album was held on June 5. The album was released on June 12, and the second edition "Deluxe Edition" was released on August 1. The title track is a high-octane dance number that serves as the theme song to the idol drama The X-Dormitory. The album also features "Subtle Love", the theme song to Moon River, a Taiwanese-Chinese idol drama.

The first edition includes a 36-page photobook, while the "Deluxe Edition" includes a 32-page photo+lyric booklet, photo cards with messages from the members and a member support fan (one randomly selected from seven designs).

The album was ranked No. 3 in Five Top Ranking (week 24 of year 2014) in the first week after release, and then ranked No. 2 in the second week.

Track listing

Music videos

References

External links
 SpeXial / Break it down | 華納線上音樂雜誌
 Break it down 情人節慶功紀念版 | 華納線上音樂雜誌

2014 albums
SpeXial albums